The London Chamber Orchestra (LCO) is a professional chamber orchestra based in London in the United Kingdom. The name has also been used by historical ensembles dating back to 1921. LCO performs at small concert halls across London and has previously toured Asia, the UK, Europe and the United States.

History
The name London Chamber Orchestra was first used in 1921 by the English conductor, organist, pianist and composer Anthony Bernard. He conducted the first LCO performance, in the salon of No. 4 St. James's Square on 11 May 1921.

Royal connection 
LCO's patron is Camilla, the Queen Consort. The London Chamber Orchestra performed at the wedding of Prince William and Catherine Middleton at Westminster Abbey on 29 April 2011. The special programme of music was conducted by Christopher Warren-Green. Music played at the royal wedding was recorded and released digitally by Decca Records on 5 May 2011.

'Longest established' claim 
LCO often describes itself as the UK's 'longest established' or 'longest standing' chamber orchestra, however fellow London orchestra, the London Mozart Players, make a similar claim. One explanation of the conflicting claims is this: although the London Chamber Orchestra name has been in use since 1921, it has been represented by a series of different, often unconnected, individuals, companies and legal entities, with several lengthy periods where no such ensemble has existed or performed.

Performances and education work
The LCO has given more than 100 UK premieres, including works by Malcolm Arnold, Manuel de Falla, Gabriel Fauré, Leoš Janáček, Maurice Ravel, Ralph Vaughan Williams, Igor Stravinsky, and, most recently, Graham Fitkin and James Francis Brown. In 2006 the LCO premiered Sir Peter Maxwell Davies's The Golden Rule, written to mark Queen Elizabeth's 80th birthday.

The orchestra also runs an education and outreach programme called Music Junction.

Direction
The London Chamber Orchestra's principal conductor, Christopher Warren-Green, has held the position of Music Director since 1988. 
The President of the Orchestra is Vladimir Ashkenazy and Rosemary Warren-Green is Education & Outreach Artistic Director.

Discography
 Mozart:  Symphony No. 29 and concertos,
 Vivaldi: The Four Seasons,
 String Serenades: Tchaikovsky, Elgar, Dvořák, Vaughan Williams, Josef Suk
 Minimalist: Philip Glass, John Adams, Steve Reich, Dave Heath
  The Harder They Fall (Original Score) (with Jeymes Samuel)

The LCO has been recorded by Virgin Records and BMG and has been broadcast by BBC Radio 3 and ITV.

References

External links
LCO web site

Musical groups established in 1921
London orchestras
Chamber orchestras
1921 establishments in England
EMI Classics and Virgin Classics artists